The Kembs-Niffer Branch Canal  is a French canal connecting the Grand Canal d'Alsace at Kembs to the Canal du Rhône au Rhin.

References

See also
 List of canals in France

Canals in France